is a 1964 Japanese film directed by Seijun Suzuki.

Synopsis
A young yakuza in love with the girl who's to marry his clan oyabun, kidnaps the girl before fleeing with her. In Tokyo, he hides under the identity of a worker while the young woman becomes a waitress in a restaurant.

Cast 
 Akira Kobayashi – Kikuji Ogata 
 Tamio Kawaji – Kenji Yoshimura
 Chieko Matsubara
 Naoko Kubo
 Kaku Takashina
 Shōki Fukae – Sakurada
 Osamu Takizawa

References

External links
 
 
 The Flower and the Angry Waves  at the Japanese Movie Database

1964 films
1964 adventure films
Films directed by Seijun Suzuki
1960s Japanese-language films
Nikkatsu films
Japanese adventure films
1960s Japanese films